The Vancouver Pop Festival was a rock festival held at the Paradise Valley Resort in Squamish, British Columbia, Canada. The dates of the festival were August 22, 23 and 24, 1969. It was produced by Candi Promotions.

Neither the Grateful Dead nor Strawberry Alarm Clock played. A band named Crow was the surprise hit for those who liked hard rock. Bikers provided an uncomfortable, "avoid taking hallucinogens" vibe.

Lineup
Due to problems with paid attendance, only some of the acts listed below performed. It has been claimed that the Grateful Dead did not perform but Jerry Garcia biographer Blair Jackson disputed this, and speculated the Dead took the gig to move on from their poor performance at the Woodstock festival a week earlier. The groups playing at the festival included (in alphabetical order):

See also
List of historic rock festivals
List of music festivals in Canada

References

External links
 Wolfgang's Vault Event Poster

1969 in Canadian music
Music festivals in British Columbia
Rock festivals in Canada
Jam band festivals
Music festivals established in 1969
Pop music festivals in Canada
1969 music festivals